Fa'side Castle (Faside Estate) has previously been known as Fawside, Falside, Ffauside, Fauxside, or Fawsyde and is a 15th-century keep located in East Lothian in Scotland. The building was restored in the 1980s and is now protected as a category B listed building.

History

The name dates from 1189, when the monks of Newbattle Abbey granted land to Saer de Quincy, 1st Earl of Winchester to build the castle on the site. It was in the possession of Alan la Zouche, 1st Baron la Zouche of Ashby, the son in law of Roger de Quincy, 2nd Earl of Winchester, on behalf of his wife, when it was besieged by Sir William Douglas in 1288. The land was lost to Robert the Bruce after the De Quincy family declared their loyalty to Edward I of England. Bruce granted the lands to the Seton family.

The Fawsydes of that Ilk acquired land in the area from the Setons in 1371. The earliest part of the present building was constructed by the Fawsydes in the 15th century.

The castle was burned by the English before the Battle of Pinkie Cleugh, which was fought nearby on 10 September 1547, suffocating or burning all those inside. Mary, Queen of Scots left Fa'side on the morning of 15 June 1567 for the Battle of Carberry Hill. She changed into a short skirt and left her fine clothes behind in a chest.

The castle was rebuilt and extended to the south in the late 16th century. On 5 November 1620 a number of local and neighbouring landowners had dinner with Janet Lawson, Lady Fawside, at the castle and illegally combined together to set and raised the price of coals from their coalmines. The Privy Council of Scotland found their actions unlawful and the lairds were ordered to pay a fine of £2,000 and be imprisoned in Edinburgh Castle. In defence the landowners claimed their coal was unprofitable, that the workings of Little Fawside (belonging to the Master of Elphinstone) were on fire, and the Fawside coal mine had bankrupted the old laird.

The Fawsydes sold the castle in 1631 to an Edinburgh burgess and merchant called Hamilton. By the 19th century it had fallen into ruin, and was close to being demolished altogether in the 1970s. However, the castle was bought and restored by Thomas Moodie Craig. Author and historian Nigel Tranter set up the Fa'side Restoration Society in 1970 through the St. Andrews Society of East Lothian, and introduced Craig to the castle in 1975. After investigation it was discovered that the original name of the castle was Fawside Castle. The restoration work began in 1976 was completed by 1982. 
The castle remains in private ownership. Faside Estate includes a stud farm and a bed & breakfast business. The building has five bedrooms while the tourist accommodation is in a tower and two cottages.

Description
Fa'side is a  L-plan building, being a fifteenth-century four-storey keep with a later turreted block added.  There is a vaulted basement. The castle stands on a high ridge with extensive views over East Lothian and the Firth of Forth.

Additional Photos

References

Bibliography
 Coventry, Martin (2001) The Castles of Scotland. Goblinshead.
 Lindsay, Maurice (1986) The Castles of Scotland. Constable.

External links

Faside Stud web site, (Official)
Faside Castle, RCAHMS

Castles in East Lothian
Category B listed buildings in East Lothian
Listed castles in Scotland
Lowland castles
Tower houses in Scotland
Tranent